The Miss Ecuador 1976, Gilda Plaza from Guayas, was crowned through a casting that was held in Telecentro in 1976. She was crowned by Ana María Wray from Guayas, Miss Ecuador 1975. She competed at Miss Universe 1976, but she did no place. Also, Claire Fontaine from Guayas was selected to compete at Miss World 1976.

Result

External links

Miss Ecuador